The 14th Asia Pacific Screen Awards were held on 11 November 2021 in Gold Coast, Queensland, Australia.

Jury
International Jury was composed of: 
 Tran Anh Hung, President, French/Vietnamese filmmaker 
 Annemarie Jacir, Palestinian filmmaker 
 Nashen Moodley, Director of Sydney Film Festival (Australia)
 Sooni Taraporevala, Indian photographer, screenwriter and filmmaker  
 Janet Wu, President of Heaven Pictures and Director of China Film Foundation – Wu Tianming Film Fund for Young Talents, (People’s Republic of China)

Winners and nominees
 and

References

External links
 

Asia Pacific Screen Awards
Asia Pacific Screen Awards
Asia Pacific Screen Awards
Asia Pacific Screen Awards